The 2005 Mississippi State Bulldogs baseball team won the SEC Tournament and placed second at the Miami Regional at the 2005 NCAA Division I baseball tournament.

Ron Polk was the coach of the Bulldogs, in his 26th year.

Regular season
The Bulldogs closed out the regular season with a 36–20 record and an SEC record of 13-16.

SEC tournament
The Bulldogs defeated LSU, South Carolina, Tennessee, and Ole Miss en route to their 5th SEC Tournament victory.

NCAA tournament
The Bulldogs were the 2 seed in the Miami regional, but lost twice to Miami and were eliminated.

Season results

See also
Mississippi State Bulldogs
Mississippi State Bulldogs baseball

References

External links
2005 Official Stats

Mississippi State Bulldogs baseball seasons
Mississippi State
Southeastern Conference baseball champion seasons
Mississippi State
Miss